Port Football Club, formerly known as Port Authority of Thailand F.C. or Thai Port F.C., is a Thai professional football club based in Khlong Toei district of central Bangkok. They compete in the Thai League 1 and are one of the most successful clubs in Thai football, having won the Kor Royal Cup 8 times and the Queen's Cup 6 times. In 2009 Thai Port added the Thai FA Cup to their list of honours. In 2010, the club was triumphant again as they won the newly introduced Thai League Cup.

History

1967–1968: Foundation
Founded in 1967 as Port Authority of Thailand Football Club by Major Prachuap Suntranakul, who was the director of Port Authority of Thailand at the time. He took on the role of chairman of Port Authority of Thailand F.C and was instrumental in helping the club during its initial years.

1968–1980: Golden age
In 1968 Port Authority of Thailand F.C. were crowned Kor Royal Cup winners, which sparked the most successful era in the club's history as they went on to win six Kor Royal Cup titles between 1968 and 1979. Port also had plenty of success in the Queen's Cup, winning it 4 times in succession from 1977 to 1980. Following the 1980 Queen's Cup win, Port Authority of Thailand F.C. won four trophies in 13 years.

2009–2010: Development of club's name and FA Cup Title
At the start of the 2009 Thailand Premier League season, the club changed its name from Port Authority of Thailand F.C. to Thai Port F.C., The name change was introduced to be in line with the new Football Association of Thailand regulations that meant all teams in the top flight must be registered as limited companies.

In the same year, Thai Port F.C. ended a 16-year wait for a trophy when they were victorious in the 2009 Thai FA Cup Final. Thai Port F.C. opponents on the day at Suphachalasai Stadium were BEC Tero. The match finished 1–1 after extra time, with Thai Port F.C. winning the penalty shoot out 5–4. Pipat Thonkanya scored the decisive spot kick after Port keeper Pattarakorn had saved BEC Tero's fifth penalty.

2011–2015: Darkest period

The Port Authority of Thailand has been granted the rights to operate the Thai Port F.C. in the Thai Premier League.

The Football Association of Thailand or the FAT and the Thai Premier League ruled on the legal dispute between the Port Authority of Thailand and the Thai Port F.C. Company, over the operating rights of the Thai Premier League's Thai Port F.C.

According to the ruling, the Port Authority of Thailand, the club's original owner, has been granted operating rights of the team for the 2011–12 Thai Premier League season.

The FAT claimed its decision is based on the fact that the club's ownership was never officially signed over to the Thai Port FC Company.

Meanwhile, President of Thai Port F.C. Company, Pichet Munkong, threatened to file a civil lawsuit in the court of law, citing Thai Premier League regulations which says that a state-enterprise such as the Port Authority of Thailand, is prohibited from operating a football club.

Pichet is planning to sue the FAT, the Thai Premier League, and the Asian Football Confederation.

However, Thai Port F.C. will only be permitted to compete in the upcoming season of the country's top flight league, set to begin on February 12, once its operator is registered as a for-profit corporation.

It remains unclear how the Port Authority of Thailand is planning to proceed with this matter.

The ongoing boardroom disputes finally took their toll as Thai Port dropped to Division 1 for the first time in 2012. Investment in the team wasn't forthcoming as several departing players were replaced with lower quality ones. Thai Port failed to find the back of the net in almost half of their league games and were relegated on the penultimate round of fixtures when they lost 2–1 at home to Muang Thong United.

2015–present: Nualphan and stabilization

In 2015, the club was taken over by Nualphan Lamsam, Thai business woman, by signing the Memorandum of Understanding of a 5-year contract with Port Authority of Thailand to control the club's management. Nualphan, commonly known to locals as ‘Madam Pang’ the majority shareholder of Muang Thai Life Insurance and the Assistant Secretary General of the Democratic Party, which has held power over Bangkok for over a decade. Since Port F.C. Co took over the management of the club in 2015 by Nualphan, the team's results have improved.

In 2017, Port returned to Thai League 1, Nualphan Lamsam announced the appointment of Kiatisuk Senamuang as the new head coach of the club; Kiatisuk was manager of the Thailand national football team 2014–2017. Kiatisuk resigned as coach of Port after just three months in charge, managing just one win, six losses and three draws during his time with the club.

In 2018, ‘Madam Pang’ loosened the purse-strings significantly in the transfer window, making a clear statement to the rest of the division. Arrivals such as winger Nurul Sriyankem from Chonburi, left-back Kevin Deeromram from Ratchaburi Mitr Phol, and most significantly, forward Dragan Bošković from Bangkok United. The club finished third in the 2018 Thai League 1 season and created history by claiming 61 points – the club's highest points in a single season under Jadet Meelarp manager.

Expected to be one of the contenders for the 2019 Thai League 1 title, Port F.C. looked on course for a successful campaign until June, when a poor run of form led to the sacking of Jadet Meelarp. The club subsequently appointed national team assistant Choketawee Promrut as head coach and former Manchester City defender Spencer Prior as technical director, sparking a reversal of the team's form as they won five of their next six games. They also qualified for the 2019 Thai FA Cup Final for the first time in a decade.

Port won the Thai FA Cup 2019 title after defeating Ratchaburi Mitr Phol 1-0 in the final held at the Leo Stadium, Midfielder Sergio Suarez scored the only goal of the game in the third minute of the second half to give Port their second Thai FA Cup title in front of FIFA president Gianni Infantino who was among those in attendance. All eyes were on the Video Assistant Referee (VAR) technology which was employed by the Football Association of Thailand for the cup final.

Supporters

Supporters of Thai Port are often referred to as the Khlong Toei Army. The name Khlong Toei Army refers to Khlong Toei District, the location of the club. "Nakrob Sad Nam-ngurn" refers to Orange-red Blue Warrior, the Thai Port's shirt colours.

The supporters of Thai Port and Chonburi have forged a very close friendship. Many supporters of Thai Port went to the FA Cup final in 2010 wearing Thai Port colors to cheer for Chonburi against Muangthong United. Likewise plenty of kitted-out Chonburi fans came to support Thai Port in their 2010 League Cup Final against Buriram PEA

The club also attracts a large number of “Farang” (foreign) supporters, probably the largest foreign matchday following of any club in Thailand. Foreign fans are attracted due to the club's central location and proximity to the MRT rail network.

Academy development
In 2015, Port opened its first youth academies, under a collaboration agreement with Pathum Khongkha school, U-14, U-16 and U-18 teams play in Thailand Youth League. An Under 14 team won 2019 Paris Saint-Germain Cup U-14.

Sponsorship

The 2013 season kits was made by Grand Sport and sponsored by Singha Drinking Water and Port Authority of Thailand.

The 2019 season kits are made by Grand Sport and sponsored by Muang Thai Insurance and Leo and Air Asia and Systema and TQM Insurance Brokers and Port Authority of Thailand.

The 2021 season, Ari is new sponsors of club.

Stadium

Port F.C. moved into the PAT Stadium in Khlong Toei district, Bangkok in 2009 which proved to be a very popular move with local supporters. Attendances rose sharply over the year and the club took the decision to build two new stands to increase the capacity from 6,000 to 7,000. Match tickets cost 100–120 baht and are bought from a small ticket office next to the stadium.

The club has a souvenir shop which is located in the Stadium grounds. The shop stocks replica shirts, scarves and other merchandise.

Stadium and locations by season records

Season record

P = Played
W = Games won
D = Games drawn
L = Games lost
F = Goals for
A = Goals against
Pts = Points
Pos = Final position
N/A = No answer

TPL = Thai Premier League
DIV1 = Thai Division 1 League
T1 = Thai League 1

PR = Preliminary Round
QR1 = First Qualifying Round
QR2 = Second Qualifying Round
QR3 = Third Qualifying Round
QR4 = Fourth Qualifying Round
RInt = Intermediate Round
R1 = Round 1
R2 = Round 2
R3 = Round 3

R4 = Round 4
R5 = Round 5
R6 = Round 6
GR = Group stage
QF = Quarter-finals
SF = Semi-finals
RU = Runners-up
S = Shared
W = Winners

Continental record

Players

Current squad

Out on loan

Former players
For details on former players, see :Category:Port F.C. players.

Managerial history

Managers/head coaches by year (1996–present)

  Daoyod Dara 
  Niwat Srisawat  
  Somchart Yimsiri 
  Paiboon Lertvimonrut 
  Sasom Pobprasert 
  Thongchai Sukkoki 
  Piyakul Kaewnamkang 
  Adul Leukijna 
  Worakorn Wichanarong 
  Dusit Chalermsan  
  Somchai Chuayboonchum  
  Paiboon Lertvimonrut 
  Gary Stevens  
  Somchai Subpherm 
  Masahiro Wada 
  Jadet Meelarp  
  Kiatisuk Senamuang  
  Jadet Meelarp  
  Choketawee Promrut 
  Jadet Meelarp  
  Sarawut Treephan  
  Dusit Chalermsan  
  Sarawut Treephan  
  Weerayut Binebdullohman (interim) 
  Jadet Meelarp 
  Scott Cooper 
  Matthew Holland (interim) 
  Choketawee Promrut  &  Surapong Kongthep

Honours

National

International
 Bordoloi Trophy
 Winners (3): 1979, 1993, 2007
 Runners-up (1): 1978
 ATPA Shield
 Runners-up (1): 1993

References

External links

 http://portfootballclub.com/ Official Website (Thai)

 
Thai League 1 clubs
Football clubs in Thailand
Association football clubs established in 1967
Sport in Bangkok
1967 establishments in Thailand